Ernst Gotthelf Gersdorff (also known as Ernst Gotthelf von Gersdorff or Karl Gotthelf) (2 November 1804 – 5 January 1874) was a German librarian, most notable for his work at the Leipzig University Library. He wrote under the pseudonym Woldemar Egg.

Life
Gersdorf was born in Tautendorf, the son of a clergyman.  In 1820 he began his studies in Theology and Philosophy.  By 1826 he was working at the Saxon State Library in Dresden.

He died in Leipzig.

Works 
 Bibliotheca Patrum ecclesiasticorum Latinorum selecta. Leipzig 1838–1847.
 Clemens <Papa, I.>: Recognitiones. Lipsiae 1838. 254 S.
 Repertorium der gesammten deutschen Literatur. Leipzig Bd. 1 (1834) - Bd. 34 (1842).
 Fortsetzung: Leipziger Repertorium der deutschen und ausländischen Literatur. Leipzig Bd. 1 (1843) - Bd. 72 (1860).
 Chronicon terrae Misnensis seu Buchense. Leipzig 1839. 33 S.
 Zur Territorialgeschichte des Herzogthums Sachsen-Altenburg. Leipzig 1854. 47 S.
 Stadtbuch von Leipzig vom Jahre 1359. Leipzig 1856.
 Die Urkundensammlung der Deutschen Gesellschaft. Leipzig 1856.
 Urkundenbuch des Hochstifts Meissen, in: Codex diplomaticus Saxoniae regiae. Leipzig 1864- 67.
 Beitrag zur Geschichte der Universität Leipzig. Leipzig 1869. 141 S.
 Urkundenbuch der Stadt Meissen und ihrer Klöster. Leipzig 1873. 455 S.
 Codex diplomaticus Saxoniae regiae. Leipzig 1882 -.

External links 
 http://aeb.sbb.spk-berlin.de/archiv6.html
 http://www.uni-leipzig.de/~agintern/uni600/ug140.htm

1804 births
1874 deaths
German librarians
German male writers